Monte B. Shapiro (May 31, 1912 – April 29, 2000) was considered to be one of the founding fathers of clinical psychology in the United Kingdom (as noted by the University of Kent, along with Hans Eysenck ). He is credited by King's College London as having developed the scientist-practitioner model in the UK.

Shapiro developed the first science oriented training program in clinical psychology in the UK at the Maudsley Hospital. He published as MB Shapiro.

The British Psychological Society identified Shapiro as one of the "influential clinicians" who created case formulation—among others such as Eysenck, Vic Meyer and Ira Turkat—a core skill required of practicing psychologists in the UK as of 2011. In particular, Shapiro developed the use of the experimental method in the individual clinical case as a way to integrate psychological practice and a scientific approach.

Shapiro's development in the 1950s of application of the experimental method to individual cases in clinical psychology, was ultimately extended to current practice in neuropsychology.

In 1984, the British Psychological Society honored Shapiro by creating the M.B. Shapiro Award, to honor a British psychologist each year who has achieved eminence in their contributions to the field. Shapiro was the first recipient of the award.

Earlier in his career, Shapiro's effort to join an elite research organization was met with rejection when his application to the Experimental Psychological Society was declined. At no time in his career was Shapiro awarded a professorship.

Although Shapiro and Eysenck worked together, they were at odds on various issues, including of note, the appointment of Stanley Rachman to their faculty.

References

1912 births
2000 deaths
Clinical psychologists
British psychologists
20th-century psychologists